Alexandru Dulău (born April 13, 1964) is a Romanian sprint canoer who competed in the 1980s. At the 1984 Summer Olympics in Los Angeles, he was eliminated in the semifinals of the K-2 1000 m event. He won a silver medal in the K-4 10000 m event at the 1986 ICF Canoe Sprint World Championships in Montreal.

References
Sports-Reference.com profile

1964 births
Canoeists at the 1984 Summer Olympics
Living people
Olympic canoeists of Romania
Romanian male canoeists
Place of birth missing (living people)
ICF Canoe Sprint World Championships medalists in kayak